Crested Butte Mountain Resort is a ski resort at Mount Crested Butte in Gunnison County, Colorado, United States.

History
Crested Butte Mountain Resort opened in 1960 when two men—Fred Rice and Dick Eflin—purchased a ranch on Mt. Crested Butte. An operating permit enabling the resort to be built was approved by the United States Forest Service the following year. The resort struggled on for its first ten years. Some of the first lifts included a t-bar at the base area.

In 1963, Crested Butte constructed a top-to-bottom gondola from the base area to near where the bottom of the High Lift is today. The resort was the second resort to open a gondola in Colorado, after Vail Ski Resort opened theirs in 1962. Constructed by Carlevaro-Savio, the three-person Silver Queen Gondola was notorious for being cramped and the cabins were known to have frequent collisions. The gondola lasted until summer of 1973, when a bubble double chairlift replaced it. Other opening lifts included a Doppelmayr T-Bar that serviced the training hill on Buckley.

Riblet constructed a double chairlift called Twister in 1969 to supplement the Silver Queen Gondola. The lift serviced expert and advanced trails on the west slope of the mountain, but following the additions of the Silver Queen and Paradise quads only operated sporadically until 2013 when it was removed from service.

In 1973, a bubble double replaced the old gondola and provided main access out of the base area for the next twenty years. Another double chairlift, Peachtree, was built at the base area to service a set of learning trails between Silver Queen and the T-Bar area. Peachtree still operates today.

In 1979, Riblet constructed the Teocalli double chairlift on the north side of the mountain, providing access to some intermediate trails, and double chairlifts were also built servicing the Paradise Bowl, which opened intermediate trails to the east of Twister as well as the East River area below that.

In 1982, Poma constructed a triple chairlift running out of the base area to replace the double chair Keystone lift, servicing beginner and low intermediate trails on the lower slopes of the mountain. The following year, they expanded the mountain by constructing two additional triple chairlifts, Gold Link and Painter Boy, servicing beginner and intermediate terrain to the north of the main mountain. In 1987, Poma constructed a platter lift servicing the North Face chutes above East River.

In 1991, a T-Bar was constructed by Doppelmayr. Called the High Lift, the new T-Bar provided access to the Headwall chutes above Paradise Bowl, and also opened additional expert terrain on the upper part of the mountain.

In 1992, Crested Butte entered the high speed lift market, with Poma replacing the Silver Queen bubble double with a high speed quad. The quad services the same terrain as the old lift, but is aligned slightly differently so as to provide better access to the High Lift. It also provides access to terrain on all other parts of the mountain as well. Two years later, the Paradise double was replaced with another high speed quad. In 1997, the Keystone triple was replaced with a high speed quad, and the original triple was used to upgrade East River.

In 2004, Crested Butte was acquired by Triple Peaks, LLC. The Keystone Express lift was renamed the Red Lady Express, while the North Face platter was replaced with a t-bar. A fixed-grip quad, Prospect, was also constructed in the Painter Boy area to open up new terrain in the area east of Gold Link and provide ski-in-ski-out access. In 2005, another fixed-grip quad, West Wall, replaced the T-bar on Buckley. In 2006, a high speed quad replaced the East River triple chairlift.

In 2008, CNL Lifestyle Properties acquired the resorts owned by Triple Peaks. Triple Peaks continued to operate them under a lease. In 2016, CNL sold the Triple Peaks-operated properties to Och-Ziff Capital Management.

On June 4, 2018, Vail Resorts announced plans to acquire Crested Butte Mountain Resort.

In 2019, the Teocalli lift was replaced with a fixed grip quad constructed by Skytrac, and realigned to end nearer to the top of the Red Lady Express.

In 2021, the resort's last double chairlift, Peachtree, was replaced with a triple chairlift constructed by Skytrac.

The mountain
Crested Butte's base area is on the western edge of the mountain. Out of the base, two learning lifts, Peachtree and Westwall, provide access to beginner and low-intermediate terrain.

The sole method of access to most of the mountain's terrain is via one of two high speed quads at the north end of the base area. On the north, the Red Lady Express lift provides access to additional beginner terrain, as well as access to lifts and trails on the north side of the mountain, as well as Painter Boy. To the south, the Silver Queen Express lift runs from the base all the way up to near the bottom of the Peak. The Silver Queen Express also provides access to advanced intermediate terrain, as well as a number of black runs such as International. From the top of Silver Queen, skiers and riders can also take a catwalk to Paradise Bowl or access a number of south-facing chutes on this part of the mountain, including Forest and Peel.

Above the top of the Silver Queen Express is the Headwall, an area of double-black diamond chutes above Paradise Bowl. These chutes are accessible via the High lift, a t-bar that originates below the top of Silver Queen and tops out at an elevation of 11,875 feet. It also provides access to the Peak (reachable by hiking only). The High Lift also has a midway unload for people not wishing to ride the entire way up. The High Lift is only accessible by taking the Silver Queen Express from the base area and taking a cutoff. Most of the chutes off this t-bar require riding Silver Queen and the High Lift.

Below the Headwall is Paradise Bowl, a mostly intermediate section of the mountain. The bowl allows for intermediate bowl skiing on a number of blue trails with names like Forest Queen and Ruby Chief. A third high speed quad, the Paradise Express lift, provides access to the trails in this area, as well as the resort's NASTAR course and a ski-cross course (for a couple of years, the ski-cross course was the location of a terrain park). A double chairlift, Teocalli, services some additional trails to the west of Paradise during peak periods.

The Paradise Express also provides access to the North Face T-Bar, which services the Extreme Limits terrain east of Paradise Bowl. These double-black chutes are relatively remote, as they require using three lifts for roundtrip skiing (East River, Paradise, and North Face).

Below Paradise Bowl is the East River trail pod. Serviced by the East River Express lift, it is composed primarily of additional blue trails with names like Floresta and Black Eagle, as well as continuations of a number of trails from Paradise Bowl, but also has a number of mogul runs. East River is also a runout for riders leaving the Extreme Limits chutes off North Face. It is a very remote section of the mountain, as it is necessary to ride Paradise to exit this area.

To the north of Red Lady is another small peak containing both of Crested Butte's triple chairlifts. Painter Boy provides access into this area from Red Lady and the rest of the mountain, and services beginner and low-intermediate trails. To the northwest, Gold Link accesses additional low-intermediate runs and also provides access to the resort's superpipe (which was originally in Paradise Bowl on Canaan until 2009). A fixed-grip quad, Prospect, provides access to additional trails to the east of Gold Link.

Terrain aspects
North: 45%
West: 45%
East: 10%

The resort today

Known for offering extreme and diverse terrain, the mountain is considered one of the birthplaces of freeskiing. They have helped revolutionize skiing by starting freeski and Telemark skiing extremes competitions. Crested Butte has also been called home for many revolutionary skiers such as Seth Morrison and FIS Alpine Ski World Cup and Winter Olympics athlete Wendy Fisher, as well as extreme sports film production company Matchstick Productions.

Crested Butte Mountain Resort, is considered an adventure ski destination. It has abundant green and blue groomed trails to more advanced longer trails and the famous extreme limits of the North Face and Headwall. The mountain also features three slope-side restaurants accessible via lift. Summer activities on the mountain include hiking, disc golf, and lift access mountain biking. The town of Crested Butte is known as the origin of mountain biking in Colorado. The lift access mountain bike trails further enhance Crested Butte as a summer riding destination.

See also
Crested Butte, Colorado
Mount Crested Butte, Colorado
Gunnison County, Colorado
Bo Callaway
State of Colorado

References

External links
Crested Butte Mountain Resort Official Website

Crested Butte Mountain Resort Official Page

Ski areas and resorts in Colorado
Tourist attractions in Gunnison County, Colorado
Buildings and structures in Gunnison County, Colorado